Joseph Lionel Taylor (born 22 January 1984) is a Samoan footballer who plays as a midfielder for Vailima Kiwi FC in the Samoa National League.

He played for Lupe o le Soaga in the 2014–15 OFC Champions League.

In the 2016 OFC Champions League, he was one of six players red-carded during Vailima Kiwi's match with Nadi F.C..

References

1984 births
Living people
Samoan footballers
Association football midfielders
Samoa international footballers
Kiwi FC players
2016 OFC Nations Cup players